The Military Police of Rio de Janeiro State (PMERJ) like other military polices in Brazil is a reserve and ancillary force of the Brazilian Army, and part of the System of Public Security and Brazilian Social Protection. Its members are called "state military" personnel.

The primary mission of PMERJ is ostensively preventive policing for the maintenance of public order in the State of Rio de Janeiro.

Under the United Nations, in cooperation with the Brazilian Army, the Military Police of Rio de Janeiro State has served in Angola, Mozambique, East-Timor, Sudan, and Haiti.

History 
The first militarized police in Portugal (when Brazil was still a colony) was the Royal Police Guard of Lisbon, established in 1801, which followed the model of the National Gendarmerie of France, created in 1791.

When the Portuguese Royal Family was transferred to Brazil, the Royal Police Guard of Lisbon remained in Portugal, and another equivalent guard was created in Rio de Janeiro under the name of Military Division of the Royal Police Guard of Rio de Janeiro, in 1809.

With the abdication of Emperor Pedro I in 1831, the Regency restructured the Brazilian Armed Forces. After its soldiers rioted, the Royal Police Guard of Rio de Janeiro was dissolved, and was replaced by the Permanent Municipal Guard Corps, a branch of the Army. Another security force similar to the French National Guard was also created. The same law allowed each Province to establish its own Guard of Volunteers.

In 1834, Pedro I died in Portugal and this reduced the fear in Brazil of a reunification of the kingdoms. In the province of Rio de Janeiro (surrounding the royal court in Rio de Janeiro city) the Provincial Police Corps was established, with professional troops. The Police Corps were created with the same structure as Brazilian Army, and to serve as reserve troops when necessary, under the provincial presidents' control. In 1835, the president of Rio de Janeiro province created the "Rio de Janeiro Province Police Guard" (Guarda Policial da Província do Rio de Janeiro).

With the proclamation of the Republic, Brazil adopted a constitution based on the United States, where the states have a large autonomy. The Corps of Police were renamed Public Forces (Força Pública) and began to be administered by the states governors and became smaller regional armies, with infantry, cavalry, artillery, and later, even air forces. This became a threat to the national army and remained until the rise of Getúlio Vargas's dictatorial government in the 1930s, when he abolished states autonomy, after Constitutionalist Revolution and Estado Novo coup, with the Brazilian army beginning its control over states military polices and military firefighters corps - including the then Federal District Military Police, which served the city of Rio de Janeiro during its days as the national capital - until 1960 -, alongside the Military Police of Rio de Janeiro State, which was separated from the city, until both organizations were merged, in 1975.

Attributions and mission 

The constitutional attributions of the Military Police of Rio de Janeiro State (PMERJ) are provided for in § 5 of Article 144 of the Constitution, "the military police responsible for the ostensive policing and the maintenance of public order".

In addition:

In the fight against organized crime, through operations to catch criminals or seizure of weapons, drugs or contraband.
Providing direct services to the population, helping to transport patients, the orientation of people in difficulty, the intervention of domestic disputes, the routing of the poor to the agencies responsible for sanitation problems, housing
In specialized policing in tourist areas, stadiums, major events and festivals.
The supervision and control of the vehicle fleet in integrated actions with other public agencies.
The preservation of flora, fauna and the environment through specialized battalion.
In the security service forums of Justice in municipalities throughout the state.
In support of court officers in repossession cases and other court orders with risk.
The security of the executive authorities, the legislature and the judiciary.
Security of witnesses and people under threat.
In support of public, state and municipal agencies in activities such actions with the population of street and dealing with children and adolescents at social risk.

Organization 
The PMERJ is operationally organized into Intermediary Commands or Policing Area Command, battalions, companies,  platoons and detachments; administratively, in untersecretariats, . Independent companies police sizable towns.
The battalions are based in major urban centers, and their companies and platoons are distributed according to population density in cities. The Military Police of Rio de Janeiro is present in all cities of the State.

Special Police Operations Battalion 

The idea of a group of police officers who were specifically trained to work in extreme risk situations arose after the tragic outcome of the hostage incident in the Criminal Evaristo de Moraes Institute in 1974. At the time the director of the prison, the police Major Darcy Bittencourt, who was held hostage by criminals who tried to escape, he was killed along with some arrested after the intervention of the police force. It was established on January 19, 1978, the Bulletin of the Military Police No. 014 on the same date as Center of Special Operations Company, through an elaborate project and presented by Captain PM Paulo César de Amendola de Souza, who witnessed the crisis, then the general commander of PMERJ, Col. Mário José Sotero de Menezes. Running in CFAP facilities of volunteers and operationally subordinate to the Chief of Staff of PMERJ. The NuCOE worked at a camp on the premises of Squares Training Centre (GFC) in Sulacap in northern Rio. There were 12 tents for about 30 policemen. On March 1, 1991, there was the creation of the Special Police Operations Battalion (BOPE).

In 2001, the BOPE adopted armored vehicles baptized as "caveirões" to protect PMs in raids in slums. Thus, the battalion was heavily criticized by human rights groups for having printed the insignia of skull pierced by a dagger.

The BOPE is considered today one of the leading police forces to combat urban guerrilla in the world, that due to its wide experience gained in over 30 years of repression of drug traffickers and armed gangs in the favelas of Rio de Janeiro.

Pacifying Police Units 

Pacifying Police Unit is a State Department project in Rio de Janeiro Security that seeks to establish community police in slums, mostly in the state capital, in order to dismantle gangs that previously controlled these territories as true parallel states. Before the project, opened in 2008, only the Tavares Bastos favela, among the more than 500 existing in the city, had no organized crime and drug trafficking.

Because the favelas with Pacifying Police Units had formerly been controlled by armed drug traffickers for more than twenty-five years, the fear of retribution, which was a mainstay of the "law of the traffickers" is slow to die. For instance, in April 2012 when a drug trafficker who had formerly controlled the favela of Mangueira was shot and killed during a police operation in Jacarezinho (before the area had received its own Pacifying Police Unit), others from the same criminal faction ordered businesses to close their doors early in Mangueira — which they did. This despite the fact that Mangueira has a permanent pacification police force as part of its own Pacifying Police Unit. A similar occurrence of businesses closing their doors early in Mangueira because the traffickers ordered it occurred in February 2013.

In May 2012, Beltrame acknowledged that armed criminals had migrated from parts of Rio that have a large police presence due to pacification, to areas with less police and no Pacifying Police Units, such as Niterói, which is nearby, across the bay. Beltrame has stated however that he believes based on analysis of crime data that only gang leaders higher in the hierarchy could reestablish in other favela communities (without Pacifying Police Units); and that lower level traffickers have a much harder time integrating into other geographic areas.

While the favela areas under pacification have seen improvements, there has been an increase in the concentration of criminals in other parts of Rio de Janeiro that don't have the direct benefits of permanent pacification police forces actively patrolling these neighborhoods. Among these areas are those of the Baixada Fluminense, Niterói, and certain neighborhoods in the North Zone.

It was obvious early on that criminals were fleeing particular favelas before BOPE entered to establish a groundwork for a permanent police presence. Previously, when police had attempted to encircle a favela by surprise in order to arrest and kill traffickers, large-scale shootouts would ensue, and innocent favela residents were caught in the crossfire.

While more high-profile gang leaders (also referred to in Rio's media as "traffickers") have been forced to leave favelas now administered by UPP police forces, their familial connections remain. Also, gang members from other favelas who are of the same faction as residents under Pacifying Police Units, still coordinate and visit each other. Exemplifying this point, one of Rio's newspapers reported on July 9, 2012 that groups of criminals fired upon police in different locations within the Complexo do Alemão on the same day that military forces completed their final withdrawal from the area.

There is a well known history of police abuse and corruption in Rio de Janeiro, and for years this only added fuel to the war between drug traffickers controlling Rio's favelas and the police.

In recent years there have been concerted efforts under Secretary Beltrame to root out corrupt police; and this is the very reason that the community policing of the favelas under the Pacifying Police Unit program are staffed by new recruits coming straight from the Pacifying Police Unit police academy — such as the 750 officers who will be policing the large Rocinha favela beginning in August 2012.

Beltrame has stated that the main purpose of the Pacifying Police Units is more toward stopping armed men from ruling the streets than to put an end to drug trafficking. A 2010 report by the World Organization Against Torture did note the drop in the homicide rate within Rio de Janeiro's favelas.

Victimization in the Military Police of Rio de Janeiro State 

Rio de Janeiro is one of the most dangerous places in the world to be a police officer.

According to a study of the analysis of victimization of military police by the State of Rio de Janeiro Military Police (PMERJ), presented by Colonel PM Fábio Cajueiro, Chief of Staff of the Police Command Specialized in the Forum of Police Officers Dead and Wounded, in Sulacap, in 23 years, from 1994 to 2016, the PMERJ had 17,686 casualties, of which 14,452 were injured and 3,234 were dead from unnatural causes.

These figures represent 19.65% of casualties (16.06% of wounded and 3.59% of deaths) of the available personnel in the period, of 90 thousand and five military police.

By way of comparison, to get a sense of how high this victimization rate is, during US participation in World War II, the American casualties rate was 6.69%. Also for comparison, the Brazilian Expeditionary Force (FEB) casualty index, in the aforementioned war, was 9.99%. Colonel PM Cajueiro pointed out that the probability of being injured as a military police officer in the State of Rio de Janeiro is 765 times greater than in wars.

Military police victimization in 2016 registered 363 PM injured by firearms, with 104 of these police officers killed. These numbers represent a break with the trend in the number of deaths of military police officers, which according to the Public Security Institute (ISP) Police Victimization Report (1998 to November 2015) had been declining since 2007, of the PMERJ.

According to the ISP report, the chance of a casualty officer being killed by assailants (robbery crime) is 5877% higher than a person from another profession.

Campaigns against crime and shootings 

Complexo do Alemão massacre
 June 27, 2007, was the result of an ongoing conflict between drug dealers and the police in the borough of the same name in Rio de Janeiro, which consisted of a group of large favelas in the northern region of the city, when a large Military Police and Civil Police of Rio de Janeiro State operation killed 19 people and injured several others.
 Helicopter shot down in gun battle
October 18, 2009, two policemen were killed after gang members shot down their helicopter during a battle with police in Rio de Janeiro, Brazil. Twelve people were killed on the ground, including two civilians. Ten of those are said to have been gang members.
 2010 Rio de Janeiro Security Crisis
In November 2010, there was a major security crisis in the Brazilian city of Rio de Janeiro and some of its neighboring cities. The city's criminal drug trafficking factions initiated a series of attacks in response to the government placing permanent police forces into Rio's slums.
 Rio de Janeiro school shooting
 April 7, 2011, 12 children aged between 12 and 14 were killed and 12 others seriously wounded after an armed man entered Tasso da Silveira Municipal School, an elementary school in Realengo on the western fringe of Rio de Janeiro. Two policemen who were patrolling the area were alerted, military policeman Third Sergeant Márcio Alexandre Alves shot the gunman in the leg and in the stomach; he fell down a staircase and then committed suicide by shooting himself in the head.

Operational Commands and Battalions 
These are the Policing Area Commands and their respective battalions, that works under the Untersecretary of Operation Management. Cities and neighborhoods indicate the location of their headquarters.

 1st Policing Area Command – city of Rio de Janeiro
 1st Battalion – Estácio
 2nd Battalion – Botafogo
 3rd Battalion – Méier
 4th Battalion – São Cristovão
 5th Battalion – Saúde
 6th Battalion – Tijuca
 13th Battalion – Downtown
 16th Battalion – Olaria
 17th Battalion – Ilha do Governador
 19th Battalion – Copacabana
 22nd Battalion – Maré
 23rd Battalion – Leblon

 1st Independent Company (Governor's Palace Guard) – Laranjeiras
 2nd Policing Area Command – city of Rio de Janeiro
 9th Battalion – Rocha Miranda
 14th Battalion – Bangu
 18th Battalion – Jacarepaguá
 27th Battalion – Santa Cruz
 31st Battalion – Barra da Tijuca
 40th Battalion – Campo Grande
 41st Battalion – Irajá
 3rd Policing Area Command – city of Mesquita
 15th Battalion – city of Duque de Caxias
 20th Battalion – city of Mesquita
 21st Battalion – city of São João de Meriti
 24th Battalion – city of Queimados
 34th Battalion – city of Magé
 39th Battalion – city of Belford Roxo
 4th Policing Area Command – city of Niterói
 7th Battalion – city of São Gonçalo
 12th Battalion – city of Niterói
 25th Battalion – city of Cabo Frio
 35th Battalion – city of Itaboraí
 5th Policing Area Command – city of Volta Redonda
 10th Battalion – city of Barra do Piraí
 28th Battalion – city of Volta Redonda
 33rd Battalion – city of Angra dos Reis
 37th Battalion – city of Resende
 6th Policing Area Command – city of Campos dos Goytacazes
 8th Battalion – city of Campos dos Goytacazes
 29th Battalion – city of Itaperuna
 32nd Battalion – city of Macaé
 36th Battalion – city of Santo Antônio de Pádua

 7th Policing Area Command – city of Petrópolis
 11th Battalion – city of Nova Friburgo
 26th Battalion – city of Petrópolis
 30th Battalion – city of Teresópolis
 38th Battalion – city of Três Rios

Special Units 
 Mounted Police regiment;
 2 Highway Patrol battalions;
 5 Environmental Protection units;
 2 Riot Control battalions;
 Special Police Operations Battalion.
 Police Operations with Dogs battalion (K-9 Unit)
 Railway Police groupment;
 Airmobile groupment;
 Maritime groupment.

Administrative commands 
 Chief of Staff of the Secretary
 Untersecretary-general of Military Police
 Personnel Planning Section
 Operational Planning Section
 Logistics Planning Section
 Coordination of Social Communication
 Untersecretary of Internal Affairs
 8 Internal Affairs units
 Forensic and Criminalistic Investigation Center
 Prison Unit
 Untersecretary of Command and Controlling
 Superintendence of Information Technology
 Superintendence of Radio Communication
 Coordination of Communication and Information Technology 
 Untersecretary of Intelligence
 Coordination of Intelligence
 Coordination of Counterintelligence
 Untersecratary of Administrative Management
 Department of Education and Instruction
 Military Police Superior College (to captains and lieutenant-colonels)
 Dom João VI Military Police Academy (to officer cadets)
 Military Police Formation Center (to non-commissioned officers and soldiers)
 3 Military schools (for young civilians)
 Department of Logistic Support
 Directorate of Transports
 Directorate of Weapons and Ammunition Supplying and Maintenance
 Directorate of Provision (foods, furniture and others)
 Directorate of Engineering and Architecture
 Directorate of Bidding and Contracts
 Department of Personnel
 Directorate of Recruitment and Selection of Personnel
 Directorate of Active Personnel
 Directorate of Payment
 Directorate of Veterans 
 Directorate of Social Assistance (welfare)
 Directorate of Personnel (civilian)
 Department of Finance
 Directorate of Patrimony
 Directorate of Finance
 Directorate of Budget
 Department of Health:
 Military Police Central Hospital, Rio de Janeiro city;
 Military Police Hospital, in Niterói;
 4 Clinics;
 Coordination of Veterinary;
 Rehabilitation Center (physical therapy)
 Department of Dentistry
 Dentistry Center

Weapons

Vehicles inventory

Aircraft inventory

Uniforms 
Since 1975, the PMERJ use dark grey blue in their uniforms. Special units have different uniforms for each service.

Ranks 
The PMERJ has the same hierarchical classification of the Brazilian Army, with another type of insignias.

Ranks and insignia 

Officers

Enlisted

All rank insignia are worn on the epaulettes of the shirt, except for sergeants, corporal and soldiers, which are worn on each sleeve, below the institutional patch (left) and state flag (right).

Gallery

In popular media

Fast Five
The PMERJ appear in Fast Five, the fifth movie of the Fast and the Furious series, where many of them are corrupt and in the payroll of drug lord Hernan Reyes, being sent to try and retrieve his vault full of his drug money after it was stolen from their station alongside the Federal Highway Police (PRF) and Rio civil police. However, thanks to Dominic Toretto and his team, all of their pursuing cruisers are destroyed, their corrupt officers slaughtered, and Reyes himself executed by DSS Agent Luke Hobbs in revenge for murdering his team back in the favelas. Only one officer is shown to be loyal and honorable to her duty as a police officer, Agent Hobbs ally in Rio, Elena Neves, whose husband served in law enforcement before he was killed in the line of duty, inspiring her to join the force, but avoid being corrupted by Reyes as so many of the other officers were. The primary vehicles of this police force featured in the film are mostly Chevy Blazers, Mazda 626, Volkswagen Passat station wagons, and Yamaha WR motorcycles.

Elite Squad
Elite Squad is a 2007 Brazilian crime film directed by José Padilha. The film is a semi-fictional account of the Batalhão de Operações Policiais Especiais (BOPE), the Special Police Operations Battalion of the Rio de Janeiro Military Police, analogous to the American SWAT teams.

See also 
 Civil Police of Rio de Janeiro State
 Batalhão de Operações Policiais Especiais (BOPE), a special police unit of the Military Police of Rio de Janeiro State (PMERJ)
 Military Firefighters Corps of the State of Rio de Janeiro

References

External links 

 Official website of Military Police of Rio de Janeiro State (in Portuguese)

Government of Rio de Janeiro (state)
Rio de Janeiro